Georgina Friedrichs (born 14 April 1995) is an Australian rugby sevens and union player.

Biography 
Friedrichs was born in Zimbabwe and moved with her family to Toowoomba in Queensland when she was eight.

Friedrichs won a silver medal at the 2018 Commonwealth Games. She made her debut for  against the Brumbies in the 2019 Super W season.

Friedrichs made her international test debut for the Australian fifteens team on 6 May 2022 against Fiji. She was named in Australia's squad for the 2022 Pacific Four Series in New Zealand. She was also called up to the Wallaroos squad for a two-test series against the Black Ferns at the Laurie O'Reilly Cup.

Friedrichs was selected in the team again for the delayed 2022 Rugby World Cup in New Zealand.

References

1995 births
Living people
Australian female rugby sevens players
Australia international rugby sevens players
Rugby sevens players at the 2018 Commonwealth Games
Commonwealth Games rugby sevens players of Australia
Commonwealth Games silver medallists for Australia
Australia women's international rugby union players
Australian female rugby union players
20th-century Australian women
21st-century Australian women
Commonwealth Games medallists in rugby sevens
Medallists at the 2018 Commonwealth Games